William Richard English-Murphy, DSO MC known as W.R.E. Murphy (1890–1975) was an Irish soldier and policeman. He served as an officer with the British Army in the First World War and later in the National Army. In the Civil War he was second in overall command of the National Army from January to May 1923. He was first Irish Commissioner of the Dublin Metropolitan Police and the last Commissioner of the force before its merger with the Garda Síochána in 1925. Thereafter he was the Deputy Commissioner of the Gardaí until his retirement in 1955.

British Army

Murphy was born in Wexford on 26 January 1890. His parents and grandparents died when he was a child. He and his sister Mae were raised by relatives in Belfast. He was completing his Masters Degree at Queens University Belfast when he followed the call of John Redmond  to join the war effort and ensure Irish Independence. Ulster Regiments rejected him because he was Catholic. Seeking a regiment that treated Irish volunteers with respect, he joined the British Army in Belfast in 1915 as an officer cadet in the South Staffordshire Regiment. 

He served in the Battle of Loos in 1915 and was wounded, but returned to action for the start of the Battle of the Somme in July 1916. He became commanding officer of the 1st Battalion; the South Staffordshire Regiment in August 1918, reaching the rank of temporary lieutenant colonel. In 1918, his regiment were posted to the Italian Front, at the Piave River, where they were when the armistice was declared on 4 November 1918.  He was granted the rank of substantive lieutenant colonel on the retired list on 16 May 1922.

After he returned to Ireland he resumed his career as a teacher. At some point he joined the Irish Republican Army – a guerrilla organisation fighting to end British rule in Ireland.

Civil War

In December 1921, the Anglo-Irish Treaty was signed between British and Irish leaders, resulting in the setting up of the Irish Free State. Conflict over the Treaty among Irish nationalists ultimately led to the outbreak of Civil War in June 1922.

In 1922 Murphy enlisted as a general in the new National Army of the Irish Free State. After the start of the Civil War, he was put in command of troops charged with taking posts held by the anti-Treaty IRA in Limerick.

At the Battle of Killmallock in July–August 1922, he was second in command to Eoin O'Duffy. His troops successfully dislodged the anti-Treaty IRA from positions around Killmallock in Limerick but Murphy was criticised for his tendency to 'dig in' and resort to trench warfare rather than rapid offensive action.

Afterwards, he was put in overall command of Free State forces in County Kerry until January 1923. He lobbied Richard Mulcahy, commander in chief, for 250 extra troops, to bring his command up to 1,500 and help to put down the guerrilla resistance there. In the early stages of the guerrilla war he organised large scale 'sweeps' to break up republican concentrations in west Cork and east Kerry. These met with little success, however. Murphy exercised overall command in the county but day-to-day operations were largely run by Brigadier Paddy Daly, of the Dublin Guard.

In October, in response to continuing guerrilla attacks on his troops, Murphy ordered a curfew to be put into place in Tralee from 10:30 until 5:39 every night.

In December, Murphy wrote to Mulcahy that the, "Irregular [Anti-Treaty] organisation here is well nigh broken up", and suggested the end of the war in the county was in sight. His optimistic prediction proved premature, however.

On 20 December, Murphy sentenced four captured republican fighters to death under the Public Safety Act for possession of arms and ammunition. However, the sentences were to be called off if local guerrilla activity ceased. Humphrey Murphy, the local IRA Brigade commander, threatened to shoot eight named government supporters in reprisal if the men were executed. Eventually their sentence was commuted to penal servitude.

In January 1923, Murphy was promoted from his command in Kerry to "responsibility for operations and organisation at the national level" in the army. Paddy Daly took over as commanding officer in Kerry. Murphy later voiced the opinion that Daly had been a bad choice, given his implication in the Ballyseedy massacre and other events of March 1923, in which up to 30 anti-Treaty prisoners were killed in the county.

Police career

Murphy left the National Army after the end of the Civil War in May 1923 and became first Irish commissioner of the Dublin Metropolitan Police. He later became deputy commissioner of the Garda Síochána, when DMP was merged with the new national police force in 1925. He held this post until his retirement in 1955.

Murphy was to the forefront of efforts to close down Dublin's red light district the Monto in the early 1920s. Between 1923 and 1925, religious missions led by Frank Duff of the Legion of Mary, a Roman Catholic organisation, and Fr. R.S. Devane worked to close down the brothels. They received the co-operation of Murphy in his role as Dublin Police Commissioner,  and the campaign ended with 120 arrests and the closure of the brothels following a police raid on 12 March 1925.

Murphy also held the post for a time of president of the Irish Amateur Boxing Association.

He died in 1975.

References

Companions of the Distinguished Service Order
Recipients of the Military Cross
Chief Commissioners of the Dublin Metropolitan Police
Garda Síochána officers
Irish people of World War I
People of the Irish War of Independence
People of the Irish Civil War (Pro-Treaty side)
Irish Republican Army (1919–1922) members
South Staffordshire Regiment officers
British Army personnel of World War I
People from County Wexford
1975 deaths
1890 births
Irish officers in the British Army
National Army (Ireland) generals